Phyllobothriidae is a family of flatworms belonging to the order Phyllobothriidea.

Genera

Genera:
 Alexandercestus Ruhnke & Workman, 2013
 Anindobothrium
 Anthobothrium

References

Platyhelminthes